Vlad is a 2003 American horror film directed by Michael D. Sellers and starring Francesco Quinn and Billy Zane. It is based on the life of Vlad Dracula, the Wallachian ruler. The film received generally negative reviews.

Plot

Cast 
 Francesco Quinn as Vlad Țepeș
 Billy Zane as Adrian
 Brad Dourif as Rădescu
 Paul Popowich as Jeff Meyer/Husband
 Kam Heskin as Alexa Meyer
  as Linsey
 Emil Hoștină as Mircea
  as Claudiu
 Guy Siner as Ilie
 John Rhys-Davies as Narrator (voice)
 Adrian Pintea as Iancu de Hunedoara 
 Claudiu Bleonț as Vlad II Dracul
  as Mircea II of Wallachia

References

External links 

 
 
 

2003 horror films
2003 films
Cultural depictions of Vlad the Impaler
American vampire films
2003 directorial debut films
Films shot in Romania
2000s English-language films
2000s American films